Aleksandr Timofeyevich Prokopenko (November 16, 1953 – March 29, 1989) was a Soviet football player. After retiring, he suffered from alcoholism, he died from choking on food in a restaurant age 35.

Honours
 Olympic bronze: 1980.
 Soviet Top League winner: 1982.

International career
Prokopenko played his only game for USSR on July 12, 1980, in a friendly against Denmark.

References

External links 
  Profile
 Inverting the Pyramid: The History of Football Tactics. Wilson, Jonathan.

1953 births
1989 deaths
Belarusian footballers
Soviet footballers
Soviet Union international footballers
Olympic footballers of the Soviet Union
Olympic bronze medalists for the Soviet Union
Footballers at the 1980 Summer Olympics
Soviet Top League players
FC Dinamo Minsk players
FC Dnepr Mogilev players
Olympic medalists in football
People from Babruysk
Medalists at the 1980 Summer Olympics
Association football midfielders
Neftçi PFK players
Sportspeople from Mogilev Region